Booking may refer to:
 Making an appointment for a meeting or gathering, as part of event planning/scheduling 
 The intake or admission process into a prison or psychiatric facility.
 Booking (manhwa), a Korean comics anthology magazine published by Haksan
 Booking (professional wrestling), the laying out of the plot before a professional wrestling match
 An accounting system a.k.a. double-entry bookkeeping system
 Booking (clubbing), the practise of forced socialisation in South Korean clubs
 Booking Holdings, American company
 Booking.com, a website for arranging hotel reservations
 Booking, scheduling services performed by a talent agent
 The noting of an offending player in professional sports, when they are shown a Penalty card

See also
 Book (disambiguation)